Ron May may refer to:
Ron May (Colorado legislator) (born 1934), American politician
Ron May (columnist) (1956–2013), American journalist
Ron May (theatre director) (born 1971), American theatre director